Robert Bailey may refer to:

 Rob Bailey (cricketer) (born 1963), English cricketer and umpire
 Rob Bailey (director), English television director
 Rob Bailey (musician), Australian bass guitarist
 Rob Bailey (TV), English TV presenter
 Robert Bailey (American football) (born 1968), American football cornerback
 Robert Bailey (epidemiologist), American epidemiologist
 Robert Bailey (geographer) (born 1939), American geographer
 Robert Bailey Jr. (born 1990), American actor
 Robert D. Bailey Jr. (1912–1994), West Virginia Secretary of State
 Robert D. Bailey Sr. (1883–1963), American judge involved in the Matewan Massacre trials
 Robert E. Bailey, U.S. Air Force Brigadier General
 Robert L. Bailey (1892–1957), 5th Lieutenant Governor of Arkansas

See also
 Robert D. Bailey (disambiguation)
 Robert Baillie (disambiguation)
 Robert Bayley (died 1859), English independent minister
 Bob Bailey (disambiguation)